Frank McCourt (1930–2009) was an Irish-American teacher and writer.

Frank McCourt is also the name of:
Frank McCourt (executive) (born 1953), American businessman
Frank McCourt (footballer) (1925–2006), Northern Irish footballer